Moreton railway station serves the villages of Moreton and Crossways in Dorset, England.  It is operated by South Western Railway and is served by their trains between London Waterloo and Weymouth. The station is  down the line from Waterloo.

History 
The station was opened in June 1847 by the Southampton and Dorchester Railway. Moreton is immediately adjacent to an automatic half barrier level crossing. Like most similar situations, this used to be a manual crossing controlled by a local signal box. This was abolished in the 1960s when signals in the locality were automated. The line between Moreton and Dorchester South was singled in the 1980s, which on many occasions causes considerable delays. It is then double track from Moreton eastwards.

Facilities 
Both platforms have step-free access. There is a bus-stop-style shelter on both platforms, as well as dot matrix displays. There is a ticket machine and bike racks only on the eastbound platform. There is a small car park adjacent to the London-bound platform.

Services
Until 1967, trains through the station were normally steam hauled. Between 1967 and 1988, passenger services were normally provided by Class 33/1 diesel locomotives with Class 438 coaching stock (also known as 4-TC units). The line was electrified in 1988, using the standard British Rail Southern Region direct current third rail at 750 volts. Class 442 electric multiple units were initially used following electrification, until being displaced by new Class 444 electric multiple units in 2007.

The station is served by an hourly South Western Railway semi-fast service in each direction between Weymouth and London Waterloo (including Sundays).

Community Rail 
Due to its location in Purbeck, the station is the westernmost station to be part of the Purbeck Community Rail Partnership.

References

External links 

Railway stations in Dorset
Railway stations in Great Britain opened in 1847
Former London and South Western Railway stations
Railway stations served by South Western Railway
1847 establishments in England
DfT Category F2 stations